Glenn is an unincorporated community in southeastern Ripley County, in the U.S. state of Missouri.

The community is located on Missouri Route H, just southwest of Torch.

History
A post office called Glenn was established in 1901, and remained in operation until 1933. The community has the name of Glenn Hess, the son of an early settler.

References

Unincorporated communities in Ripley County, Missouri
Unincorporated communities in Missouri